Life Could Be a Dream may refer to:
"Sh-Boom", sometimes referred to as "Life Could Be a Dream", a doo-wop song published in 1954
Life Could Be a Dream (musical), a jukebox musical by Roger Bean
Life Could Be a Dream, an album by 90s punk band Auntie Christ
Life Could Be a Dream, a 1986 short film about Nick Mason of Pink Floyd and his interest in motor racing

Life could be a dream was also made a meme in 2021 but everyone knows that it is still a meme till this day